María Pérez Araújo (born August 1, 1997), known professionally as María Araújo is a Spanish basketball player for Uni Girona CB. She was the MVP at the 2017 FIBA Europe Under-20 Championship for Women, where the Spain women's national under-20 basketball team won the gold medal. In November 2017 she received her first call-up for the senior national team. In 2018 she signed for Polish team Wisła Can-Pack Kraków. In 2019 she signed for Spanish team Uni Girona CB.

Club career
Araújo started in the youth levels of Celta de Vigo Baloncesto, where her mother had played professionally. She played her first game with the senior team in the Spanish second tier at 14, where she continued until 2015. She played the next three seasons for Universitario de Ferrol in the Spanish top tier. In May 2018 she signed for the Polish team Wisła Can-Pack Kraków.  In 2019 she signed for Spanish team Uni Girona CB.

European cups stats

National team
She played in the youth teams of the Spanish national team from 2014 to 2017, reaching the final in all the tournaments that she played. She made her debut with the senior team in 2017 at 20 years of age, for the EuroBasket Women 2019 qualification games:

  2014 FIBA Under-17 World Championship for Women (youth)
  2015 FIBA Europe Under-18 Championship for Women (youth)
  2017 FIBA Europe Under-20 Championship for Women (youth) (MVP)

References

1997 births
Living people
Spanish women's basketball players
Sportspeople from Vigo
Forwards (basketball)